The Kouroufing National Park is found in Mali. It was established on 16 January 2002. This site is 557 km.

The park is part of the Bafing Biosphere. To the north of the park is Lake Manantali, an artificial lake.

References

National parks of Mali
Protected areas established in 2002
2002 establishments in Mali